Finsland or Finnsland is a village in Kristiansand municipality in Agder county, Norway. The village is very small and it is located in a very rural area, but it is the site of Finsland Church, the main church for the northern half of Songdalen municipality. The village was the administrative centre of the old municipality of Finsland which existed from 1838 until its dissolution in 1964.

Name
The municipality (originally the parish) was named Finsland. The name comes from the old "Finsland" farm which is situated by the river Finnsåna, which flows into the Mandalselva. There are also farms nearby called Finsdal and Finsådal. The first element is the word finne means "wilderness" or "remote". The second element land is the same as the word for "land".

References

External links
Weather information for Finsland 

Villages in Agder
Geography of Kristiansand